Isthmohyla calypsa is a species of frogs in the family Hylidae. It is known from the southern Cordillera de Talamanca in Costa Rica, Cerro Pando in Costa Rica and Panama, and the Pacific slope in southwestern Panama. It appears to now be extirpated from Costa Rica. Prior to its description in 1996, this species was confused with Isthmohyla lancasteri, a species now known from lower altitudes only.

Description
The dorsum is metallic green, mottled with darker drab green or brown blotches and covered by large, spinous bumps (females are spinier than males). Also the limbs are spiny. The ventrum is white and has some scattered black blotches or smaller spots. The groin and the thighs are bright white and have scattered black spots.

Habitat and conservation

This species has disappeared from Costa Rica. Its abundance in Panama is unknown although it is assumed to have declined there too. The declines have happened within pristine habitats and are probably caused by chytridiomycosis. Also habitat loss from smallholder livestock farming is a threat for this species. It has been recorded in the La Amistad International Park and might occur in the Volcán Barú National Park.

References

calypsa
Amphibians of Costa Rica
Amphibians of Panama
Amphibians described in 1996
Taxonomy articles created by Polbot